The Dotty World of James Lloyd is a 1964 TV documentary directed by Ken Russell about artist James Lloyd.

Lloyd later worked with Russell on Always on Sunday.

References

External links
The Dotty World of James Lloyd at IMDb

1964 television films
British television documentaries
Films directed by Ken Russell